The 216th Division was created in November 1949 under the Regulation of the Redesignations of All Organizations and Units of the Army, issued by Central Military Commission on November 1, 1948, basing on the 3rd Division, 1st Corps, 1st Army Group of the People's Liberation Army of the Nationalist Party of China. Its history can be traced to the 307th Division, 100th Corps, 1st Army Group of Republic of China Army defected in August 1948.

The division is part of 52nd Corps. Under the flag of 216th division it took part in the Chinese Civil War. The division was disbanded in October 1950.

References

Infantry divisions of the People's Liberation Army
Military units and formations established in 1949
Military units and formations disestablished in 1950